Bishop Curry may refer to:
James E. Curry (b. 1948), suffragan bishop of the Episcopal Diocese of Connecticut
L. F. P. Curry (1887–1977), presiding bishop of the Reorganized Church of Jesus Christ of Latter Day Saints
Michael Curry (bishop) (b. 1953), presiding bishop of the Episcopal Church
Thomas John Curry (b. 1943), auxiliary bishop of the Catholic Archdiocese of Los Angeles